Miss Christina is a 1936 novella by the Romanian writer Mircea Eliade. It tells the story of the attraction between a female strigoi—an undead human from Romanian folklore—and a young man who visits the house she haunts. An English translation by Ana Cartianu was published in 1992 as part of the Eliade omnibus volume Mystic Stories. The novella has been the basis for two Romanian film adaptations with the same title.

References

1936 novels
Ghost novels
Romanian novels adapted into films
Romanian novels
Works by Mircea Eliade